Tounfit is a town in Midelt Province, Drâa-Tafilalet, Morocco. According to the 2004 census it has a population of 7278.

References

Populated places in Midelt Province